The baiocco is an ancient Italian currency denomination largely used in Central Italy, especially in Latium. The origin of the name is uncertain. Its value was originally equivalent to a shilling, slowly changing through centuries into five quattrini, or consequently twenty pennies.

The size, weight and value of the coin itself changed over time. 

At a certain point, towards the middle of the 16th Century, it became so thin that it deserved the nickname "Baiocchino" or "Baiocchétto" because it actually weighed less than 0.25g.

It underwent numerous other variations of material losing more and more silver and becoming more and more low alloy, so much so that it was indicated with the derogatory "Baiocchella" during the period of Sixtus V from 1585 to 1590.

It disappeared after the unification of Italy between 1861 and 1870, when the Italian lira was introduced as an equivalent of the french franc.

See also
 Pound (currency)
 Shilling
 Penny

References

Currencies of Italy
Coins of Italy